This list of Oregon State University athletes includes graduates, non-graduate former students and current students of Oregon State University who are notable for their achievements within athletics, sometimes before or after their time at Oregon State. Other alumni can be found in the list of Oregon State University alumni; notable administration, faculty, and staff can be found on the list of Oregon State University faculty and staff. All intercollegiate sports teams at Oregon State are called the Oregon State Beavers.

Baseball

Basketball

Football (American)

Football coaching

Soccer

Swimming and diving

Track and field

Winter sports

Wrestling

Multi-sport

Legend

References

External links
Official Oregon State athletics site

Oregon State University people
Oregon State athletes
Oregon state